Jeff Roches is an American actor, best known for his work with director Sean Weathers. He is the youngest of six children. After his studies in classical music for six years, he completed his first of fifteen short stories at the age of 18. He would go on to write articles on his view of life. In 2000 he composed a four-minute symphony untitled, a combination of; symphony drums, flute, violin, trumpet, and cello for orchestra. A year later he decided not to continue his music career, though he performed as hype-man for rapper 'Timothy Dark' from 2001 to 2003 in various settings, and clubs including CBGB's, and "Sidewalk cafe".

Acting
In 2001 his leg was featured a public service announcement for 'NY Youth'. The project and a few short films were the start of his lengthy career. In 2002, he auditioned for 'Full Circle Films' and landed a role as a Heroin addict in Weather's They All Must Die! and returned later that year to film Lust For Vengeance. He starred in several films in 2003 and 2004, one of which led to a role in the experimental film The Fix by Aswad Issa. The film was six years in the making. It derived from a series of shorts shot in 2003 and 2004, then a full length set for 2011. Roches was featured as "snake" in 2009's Surviving the Streets directed by Adam Litwinski for the 'New York International Film Festival'. Roches starred in the 2009 short Course, directed by Michael Shanon for the 'Queens international 2009 film festival".

Filmography
Lust For Vengeance
Hookers In Revolt
 Course
The Unfinished work of Sean Weathers

See also
List of film director and actor collaborations
Patrick Harper; Dora Albanese, Sean weathers, Igor Norgavile, Michael Shanon, Adam Litwinski, Aswad Issa, Bernard Gorley, Timothy Dark

References

Sean weathers, Igor Norgavile, Michael Shanon, Adam Litwinski, Aswad Issa, Bernard Gorley, Timothy Dark

External links
Jeff Roches on Amazon.com

Jeff Roches at Rotten Tomatoes

Living people
1980s births
Date of birth missing (living people)
African-American male actors
Male actors from New York (state)
American male film actors
21st-century African-American people
20th-century African-American people